The 57th Cinema Audio Society Awards was held on April 17, 2021, virtually, honoring outstanding achievement in sound mixing in film and television of 2020.

Winners and nominees

References

2020 film awards
2020 television awards
Cinema Audio Society Awards
2020 in American cinema
2020 guild awards